Thomas Stehle (born 26 October 1980) is a German defender who is currently a free agent.

References

1980 births
Living people
German footballers
1. FC Nürnberg players
Alemannia Aachen players
Bundesliga players
2. Bundesliga players
3. Liga players
SC Pfullendorf players
Association football defenders
People from Überlingen
Sportspeople from Tübingen (region)
Footballers from Baden-Württemberg